The Annals of the American Thoracic Society is an official medical journal of the American Thoracic Society (ATS). It publishes original clinical and epidemiological research in the fields of pulmonology, critical care medicine, and sleep medicine. Known colloquially as the "White Journal", the Annals of the American Thoracic Society is one of four journals published by the American Thoracic Society, along with the American Journal of Respiratory and Critical Care Medicine ("Blue Journal"), American Journal of Respiratory Cell and Molecular Biology ("Red Journal"), and ATS Scholar.

Contents

The Annals of the American Thoracic Society is a peer-reviewed medical journal that publishes clinical trials and original scientific research related to adult and pediatric pulmonary and respiratory sleep medicine, as well as adult critical care medicine, that is applicable to clinical practice, the formative and continuing education of clinical specialists, and the advancement of public health. With a focus on clinical practice, the journal features original research articles, brief communications, focused reviews, perspectives, opinions and ideas, and NIH workshop reports.

Since 2013, the journal has produced a monthly podcast in which clinicians and contributing authors to the Annals of the American Thoracic Society discuss a range of topics pertaining to pulmonary, critical care, and sleep medicine in order to help research findings reach a wider audience.

The journal's impact factor of 8.785 was announced June 2022 by the Web of Science. As of 2020, it has a 19% acceptance rate for original research articles.

History
The journal was established in 2004 as the Proceedings of the American Thoracic Society, obtaining its current name in 2013. The editor-in-chief was Alan R. Leff (University of Chicago Medical Center). He was succeeded in 2012 by John Hansen-Flaschen (University of Pennsylvania). David Lederer (Columbia University Medical Center) became the third editor-in-chief on April 1, 2017. Colin Cooke (University of Michigan) assumed the interim editor-in-chief role on June 27, 2019, and on January 22, 2020 was named the editor-in-chief for a 5-year term. The journal is published online and in print.

Abstracting and Indexing
The journal is abstracted and indexed in MEDLINE, Index Medicus/PubMed, Chemical Abstracts, Web of Science, and the Emerging Sources Citation Index.

References

External links 

Clinician to Clinician: an AnnalsATS Podcast

Publications established in 2004
Pulmonology journals
Academic journals published by learned and professional societies of the United States
English-language journals
Monthly journals